Mark Benfield (born 3 December 1976) is a South African cricketer. He played in 42 first-class and 38 List A matches from 1995/96 to 2001/02.

References

External links
 

1976 births
Living people
South African cricketers
Eastern Province cricketers
Gauteng cricketers